The Station is a planned shopping centre located in Rolleston, New Zealand. Construction will start in 2023.

History 
The name of the proposed retail centre was chosen to acknowledge Rolleston’s early history as a railway terminal. 

Rolleston Industrial Holdings applied for resource consent with the Selwyn District Council in 2022. As of December 2022, further plans have not been released.

Tenants 
The development is set to have approximately 50 stores.

Parking 
The development has space for 1,906 car including 71 mobility bays, and 181 cycle parks.

The Station plan also includes space for a potential park-and-ride facility and bus station, alongside Rolleston’s existing city-bound railway station.

See also
 List of shopping centres in New Zealand

References 

Shopping centres in New Zealand
2020s architecture
Rolleston, New Zealand
Buildings and structures in Canterbury, New Zealand